Gephyroglanis gymnorhynchus is a species of claroteid catfish endemic to the Democratic Republic of the Congo where it is found in the Aruwimi River.  This species grows to a length of 14.6 cm (5.7 inches) SL.

References 
 

Claroteidae
Fish of the Democratic Republic of the Congo
Endemic fauna of the Democratic Republic of the Congo
Fish described in 1914